
Year 373 BC was a year of the pre-Julian Roman calendar. At the time, it was known as the Third year without Tribunate or Consulship (or, less frequently, year 381 Ab urbe condita). The denomination 373 BC for this year has been used since the early medieval period, when the Anno Domini calendar era became the prevalent method in Europe for naming years.

Events 
 By place 

 Persian Empire 
 The Persian King Artaxerxes II launches an invasion of Egypt to bring that country back under Persian rule. The invasion is led by Pharnabazus. After initial successes, the Greek mercenaries fighting for the Persians push on towards Memphis. However, King Nectanebo I is able to gather his forces and repulse the Persian invasion.

 Greece 
 Iphicrates leads an Athenian expedition which successfully relieves Corcyra of a Spartan siege.
 The ancient Greek city of Helike is destroyed by a massive earthquake and tsunami.
 The Temple of Apollo in Delphi is destroyed by an earthquake.

Births

Deaths

References